Lenswood wine sub-region is a wine sub-region located around the town of Lenswood in South Australia within the Mount Lofty Ranges to the east of the Adelaide city centre.  The sub-region received appellation as an Australian Geographical Indication (AGI) on 16 October 1998.  The sub-region is part of the Adelaide Hills wine region and the Mount Lofty Ranges zone.

See also

South Australian wine

Citations and references

Citations

References

Wine regions of South Australia